Jhon Cagua is an Ecuadorean defender who currently plays for FC Haka. Nicknamed "El Comunitario John" or "El Viejo John", Cagua had one of the most powerful strikes in the history of football. His typical played nicknamed "El Ollaso" consisted of kicking the ball from his own field to the rivals area, regardless of his position in the field.

Clubs

External links
 

1975 births
Living people
Sportspeople from Esmeraldas, Ecuador
Ecuadorian footballers
Ecuador international footballers
Ecuadorian Serie A players
Veikkausliiga players
C.D. ESPOLI footballers
C.S. Emelec footballers
S.D. Quito footballers
Barcelona S.C. footballers
C.D. Cuenca footballers
C.D. El Nacional footballers
FC Haka players
Ecuadorian expatriate footballers
Expatriate footballers in Finland
Association football defenders